Elsbeth Tronstad (born 1956) is a Norwegian businessperson and politician for the Conservative Party. She is currently State Secretary in Solberg's Cabinet.

From 2009 to 2014, she was the director of communication SN Power. From 2005 to 2009, she was the executive director for communication in the Confederation of Norwegian Enterprise. She has worked in the Norwegian Agency for Development Cooperation, Det Norske Veritas and ABB.

As a politician she served as private secretary (today known as political advisor) in the Office of the Prime Minister from 1989 to 1990, in Syse's Cabinet. From 2001 to 2002, under the second cabinet Bondevik, she was a State Secretary in Bondevik's Second Cabinet. She is also a former member of Bærum municipal council.

Tronstad is the deputy chair of the board of directors of Vinmonopolet and the Norwegian Institute of International Affairs, is a member of the board of the DnB NOR Savings Bank Foundation and a former board member of Sparebanken NOR in Eastern Norway.

References

1956 births
Living people
Norwegian businesspeople
Conservative Party (Norway) politicians
Norwegian state secretaries
Bærum politicians